Edward Gosek is an American ice hockey coach and former player who was the NCAA Division III coach of the year.

Career
Gosek was born and raised in Oswego, New York. He began attending State University of New York at Oswego in 1979 and played 4 years of varsity ice hockey for the team. During his time as a player, Gosek helped Oswego State become one of the top teams in Division II, winning two division titles, two division tournament titles, and making the first two NCAA Tournament appearances in program history. 

After graduating with a bachelor's in education, Gosek remained in the area and became a coaching coordinator for the Oswego Minor Hockey Association in 1986. Four years later, he returned to his alma mater as an assistant under his former head coach, Don Unger. He remained in the position when George Roll took over in 1997 and the Lakers slowly built up into a power in the SUNYAC. While working as an assistant, Gosek returned to the classroom and earned a master's in education in 2001. Two years later, the Lakers posted their best record since Gosek's sophomore year and reached the championship game for the second time in program history. Afterwards, Roll left to take over at Clarkson and Gosek was named as his replacement.

Gosek's teams played well in his first few seasons, however, the team faltered in conference tournament for three consecutive years. In 2007, however, Oswego's record was good enough to get them a bid into the NCAA Tournament. He got his team to refocus after their failure in the conference tournament and Oswego won three games, including the final over three-time defending champion Middlebury, to win the program's first national championship. He received the Edward Jeremiah Award as the national coach of the year for the tremendous season.

After a slight two year lull, Gosek had his team back in the tournament and reached five consecutive Frozen Fours, including back-to-back championship game appearance. Unfortnately, he wasn't able to win a second title in that stretch. In the years since, Gosek has kept his team near the top of the D-III level. In 18 years behind the bench, he has yet to have a losing record and is the winningest coach in program history.

Personal life
Ed's older brother Joe is a professional race car driver who has competed at the Indianapolis 500 and is a member of the Oswego Speedway Hall of Fame.

Statistics

Regular season and playoffs

Head coaching record

References

External links

1961 births
American ice hockey coaches
American men's ice hockey players
Living people
Ice hockey people from New York (state)
People from Oswego, New York
State University of New York at Oswego alumni
State University of New York at Oswego faculty